The 1986 Pan American Race Walking Cup was held in Saint Léonard, Québec, Canada, on 3–4 October.  The track of the Cup runs in the Boulevard Lacordaire.

Complete results, medal winners until 2011, and the results for the Mexican athletes were published.

Medallists

Results

Men's 20 km

Team

Men's 50 km

Team

Women's 20 km

Team

Participation
The participation of 67 athletes from 9 countries is reported.

 (1)
 (16)
 (5)
 (2)
 (2)
 México (12)
 (6)
 (17)
 (7)

See also
 1986 Race Walking Year Ranking

References

Pan American Race Walking Cup
Pan American Race Walking Cup
Pan American Race Walking Cup
Athletics (track and field) in Canada